Amy Lynn Rudolph (born September 18, 1973) is a retired American middle- and long-distance runner who competed mostly in the 5000 meters. She represented her country at two consecutive Summer Olympics, starting in 1996, as well as four World Championships. She was born in Kane, Pennsylvania and attended Kane Area High School.

Amy was named associate head women's cross country coach/assistant track and field coach at Iowa State University in August 2018.

Competition record

References

External links
 
 
 https://cyclones.com/staff-directory/amy-rudolph/528

1973 births
Living people
American female long-distance runners
American female middle-distance runners
Athletes (track and field) at the 1996 Summer Olympics
Athletes (track and field) at the 2000 Summer Olympics
Olympic track and field athletes of the United States
People from Elk County, Pennsylvania
Track and field athletes from Pennsylvania
21st-century American women